Vasilios Athanasiou (born 24 July 1999) is a Greek professional footballer who plays as a goalkeeper for Super League club PAS Giannina.

Career 
On 29 September 2020, Athanasiou transferred to PAS Giannina. Athanasiou made his debut for the first team on 17 January 2021, replacing Lefteris Choutesiotis on half time against Olympiacos at Karaiskakis.

References

1999 births
Living people
Greek footballers
Greece youth international footballers
Greek expatriate footballers
Football League (Greece) players
Serie C players
Serie D players
Super League Greece players
Panegialios F.C. players
U.C. AlbinoLeffe players
Mantova 1911 players
PAS Giannina F.C. players
Greek expatriate sportspeople in Italy
Expatriate footballers in Italy
Association football goalkeepers
Footballers from Aigio